The visit to Baku of the Emperor of the Russian Empire Alexander III Alexandrovich, Empress Maria Feodorovna and their children, Nikolai Alexandrovich and Georgy Alexandrovich, took place on 8 (20) - 9 (21) October 1888. This was the first and only visit of the Russian monarchs to Baku.

By the time the Emperor and his family arrived to Baku, the city had already been the administrative center of the Baku province for 29 years and was considered, if not the first, then at least the second city in the Caucasus in terms of the number of inhabitants. So, in 1888, according to the investigations begun by the police, up to 80 thousand people lived in Baku, most of them were Azerbaijanis (“Aderbeyjan Tatars” in the terminology of that time). The income of Baku in 1886 reached 327 thousand rubles, and the main source of it was the fee for the unloading goods at the quays of the city (up to 90 thousand rubles).

8 October 1888 

The imperial train arrived to Baku on Saturday, 8 (20) October 1888 at 2 pm. A standard flew over the Governor's House, and a salute was heard from the battery and ships. The railway station was decorated with flags and plants. All the pillars were entwined with greenery, which was brought from Lankaran.

On the station's platform, the imperial family was greeted by the Baku Vice-Governor, the actual State Councilor, I.A. Benislavsky, the Chief Commander of the Ports and the Commander of the Baku Port, Rear Admiral V. Ya. Bal, the Chief of Police Lieutenant, I. A. Deminsky, and the Mayor, S. I. Despot-Zenovich, and the Councilors of the Duma. The Emperor and his family went around the representatives of the city and received the bread and salt on a silver platter. The mayor Despot-Zenovich made a welcoming speech.

Later, the ladies of the Baku society introduced themselves to the Empress Maria Feodorovna, and the wife of the Governor of the Province presented the empress with a bouquet of flowers. Among the ladies were Muslim women in rich brocade national costumes. The Mayor presented the Empress with a bouquet of flowers in a golden port-bouquet, on which, on one side, “1888, Baku” was depicted in enamel, and on the other, Her Majesty's monogram made of diamonds. Masses of people in colorful costumes stood on the streets. The whole city was decorated with flags, even phaetons and carts were driven around decorated with flags.

From the station, the imperial family went to the cathedral. There were masses of people and trellises of troops along this road. In the cathedral, the imperial family was greeted by the Exarch of Georgia, His Eminence Palladium, who welcomed the Emperor with a speech. From the cathedral, the imperial family went to the governor's house. Along this path, there were unarmed troops with choruses of music. Starting from the embankment, the troops were replaced by pupils of educational institutions, and those of women's educational institutions settled near the imperial house. A guard of honor stood in the front of the entrance - the 1st company of the 81st Absheron Infantry Regiment. Arriving on the square to the Governor's House and leaving the carriage, the imperial family bypassed all deputations from all estates of the Baku province. Among them were the deputations of the Dagestan region, which were represented by the Major General Prince Chavchavadze, the Major General Gaidarov, representatives of the Transcaspian region headed by the Lieutenant General Komarov, the Head of the Merv District Alikhanov, as well as Nurberdy Khan's widow, Khansha Gul-Jamal-bay with two sons. After bypassing the delegations, the guard of the Absheron regiment passed by the Emperor in a ceremonial march.

At half past three, the imperial family visited the Mariinskaya Women's Gymnasium. At the entrance, they were greeted by the Mayor and the administration of the gymnasium. As soon as the Emperor and the members of his family entered the vestibule, the choir of students of the gymnasium and students from the real school, with the accompaniment of the organ and the piano, sang Beethoven's hymn "Glorification of God." Then the imperial family went to the Assembly Hall, where they listened to two plays and the choir "Dawn" by Tchaikovsky. After that, the students presented the Empress with a white tablecloth with the coat of arms of the city of Baku embroidered in silk.

After that, the imperial family went to the women's gymnasium of the St. Nina, where they were met by the Vice-Governor I. A. Benislavsky. The Empress was greeted with a speech by the student Yakubovskaya who graduated from the course that year. Along with the School of the St. Nina's students, the pupils of the orphanage of the local charitable society also brought gifts to the imperial couple. Afterwards, the Emperor and his family proceeded to the courtyard of the institution, where the students of the city schools were gathered.

Notes

References

Alexander III of Russia
History of Baku
1888 in the Russian Empire
19th century in Azerbaijan